Bray v Ford [1896] AC 44 is an English defamation law case, which also concerns some principles of conflict of interest relevant for trusts and company law.

Facts
Mr Bray was a governor of Yorkshire College. Mr Ford was the vice-chairman of the governors and had also been working as a solicitor for the college. Bray sent him a letter, and circulated it to others, saying,

“Sir, during last summer, as you are aware, it came to my knowledge that whilst holding the fiduciary position of vice-chairman of the Yorkshire College you were illegally and improperly, as you know, making profit as its paid solicitor.”

This was held to be libellous by the jury at trial. But Cave J had directed the jury that the College’s articles did in fact allow for pay of services as a solicitor. The jury awarded £600 damages, and the question was whether the award could stand in the face of the misdirection.

The Court of Appeal (Lord Esher MR, Lopes LJ and Rigby LJ) held this was a misdirection, but that it was libel anyway, the misdirection was unsubstantial and the jury would have decided the same.

Judgment
The House of Lords, composed of Lord Halsbury LC, Lord Watson, Lord Herschell, Lord Shand unanimously reversed the Court of Appeal’s decision, on the basis that the decision of whether a libel existed was peculiarly within the jury’s power to decide, and the misdirection did constitute a ‘substantial wrong or miscarriage’ requiring a new trial. Lord Herschell's opinion went as follows..

See also
Cook v Deeks [1916] 1 AC 554
Regal (Hastings) Ltd v Gulliver [1942] 1 All ER 378
Industrial Development Consultants Ltd v Cooley [1972] 1 WLR 443 
Gencor ACP Ltd v Dalby [2000] 2 BCLC 734
CMS Dolphin Ltd v Simonet [2001] 2 BCLC 704

Notes

United Kingdom company case law
English defamation case law
House of Lords cases
1896 in British law
1896 in case law